Maria Cristina Grado (February 2, 1939 - January 3, 2016) was an Italian actress and voice actress. She also worked as a voice actress, dubbing foreign films for release in the Italian market.

Selected filmography
 Naples Sings (1953)
 We, the Women (1953)
 Cavalcade of Song (1953)
 The Count of Monte Cristo (1954)
 Tower of Lust (1955)
 The Courier of Moncenisio (1956)
 The Angel of the Alps (1957)

References

Bibliography 
 Hayward, Susan. French Costume Drama of the 1950s: Fashioning Politics in Film. Intellect Books, 2010.

External links 
 

1939 births
2016 deaths
Italian film actresses
Italian voice actresses
Actresses from Rome